The 2018 Women's Hockey RaboTrophy was the fifth edition of the women's field hockey tournament. The RaboTrophy was held in Breda from 26 to 30 June 2018, and featured four of the top nations in women's field hockey.

The Netherlands won the tournament for the third time, defeating Japan 8–2 in the final.

The tournament was held in conjunction with the Men's FIH Champions Trophy.

Competition format
The four teams competed in a pool stage, played in a single round robin format. At the conclusion of the pool stage, the top two teams contested the final, while the remaining two competed for third place.

Teams
The following four teams competed for the title:

Officials
The following umpires were appointed by the International Hockey Federation to officiate the tournament:

 Lisette Baljon (NED)
 Noelia Blanco (ESP)
 Junko Wagatsuma (JPN)
 Rebecca Woodcock (ENG)
 Liu Xiaoying (CHN)

Results
All times are local (Central European Time).

Preliminary round

Fixtures

Classification round

Third and fourth place

Final

Statistics

Final standings

Goalscorers

References

External links
Official Website

RaboTrophy
Hockey RaboTrophy
Women's Hockey RaboTrophy
Hockey RaboTrophy
Sports competitions in Breda